Phillip Paul Bliss House is a historic home located at Rome, Bradford County, Pennsylvania. The house was built in 1863–1864, and is a vernacular Greek Revival-style frame dwelling.  It consists of a two-story front section with a one-story rear ell.  It has a gable roof and a full-length front porch with a shed roof.  It was the home of 19th century gospel music composer Phillip Paul Bliss (1838-1876).

In 1965, the house was opened as the Philip P. Bliss Gospel Songwriters Museum.

It was added to the National Register of Historic Places in 1986.

See also
 List of music museums

References

External links
P.P. Bliss Gospel Songwriters Museum website

Museums in Bradford County, Pennsylvania
Houses on the National Register of Historic Places in Pennsylvania
Greek Revival houses in Pennsylvania
Houses completed in 1864
Houses in Bradford County, Pennsylvania
Music museums in Pennsylvania
Bliss
Museums established in 1965
1965 establishments in Pennsylvania
National Register of Historic Places in Bradford County, Pennsylvania